Climax is an unincorporated community in Pittsylvania County, in the U.S. state of Virginia.

Climax has been referenced in popular culture thanks to Tim Smith, who is featured on the hit show Moonshiners. Tim opened a legal distillery and now sells moonshine under the name Climax Moonshine.

References

Unincorporated communities in Virginia
Unincorporated communities in Pittsylvania County, Virginia